Xiwen Street is a metro station on Line 5 of the Hangzhou Metro in China. It is located in the Xiacheng District of Hangzhou.

Gallery

References

Railway stations in Zhejiang
Railway stations in China opened in 2020
Hangzhou Metro stations